Super C is a Quebec discount supermarket chain with 98 stores in Quebec. The stores average  in size. Super C offers 8,000 products including some 1,200 products from the Super C private label brand.

Super C traces its origins as La Ferme Carnaval founded on September 15, 1982  which opened a supermarket under the trade name Super Carnaval on January 12, 1983 in Beauport, Quebec. The company was acquired by Metro-Richelieu on June 1, 1987 from Toronto-based Burnac Corporation. 

In 1991, the 14 Super Carnaval outlets were converted in phases to the new banner Super C with the last stores renamed by May 1992.  Since then, Super C has expanded by either obtaining the lease of vacant shopping mall anchor spaces, building its own free-standing stores or replacing Metro-branded locations. Only a handful of today's Super C outlets are former Super Carnaval grocery stores.

In mid-2006, all but one of the 9 remaining Ontario stores were converted to Food Basics or Loeb stores. The Pembroke, Ontario store closed, and the building is now occupied by Value Village.

In 2013, there were 85 Super C's across the province of Quebec. By 2022, 101 Super C stores were operational in Quebec providing great offers through its flyers  that made it a leader in Quebec’s discount supermarket division.

Advertising slogans 
1998–2004: Alimentation aux Meilleurs Prix! (Food at the Best Prices!) (used in stores in Quebec)
1998–2004: Fresh Food for Less! (used in Ontario stores and in English media in Ontario and Quebec)
2004–2006: Where food prices are lower every day (used in Ontario stores and in English media in Ontario and Quebec)
2004-2009/10: C'est le meilleur Marché (It's the best market)
2009–present: Beau, bon, pas cher (Beautiful, good, cheap)

Private labels 
 Selection
 Éconochoix / Econochoice
 Irresistibles
 Super C
 Loeb Bakery Shoppe
 The Event Pleaser
 Red Grill Meats

See also 
 Food Basics
 Maxi (Canadian supermarket)
 List of supermarket chains in Canada

References

External links 
 

Companies based in Montreal
Metro Inc.
Supermarkets of Canada
Discount stores of Canada
1982 establishments in Quebec